Henryk Mazur (born 29 January 1953, in Tarnów) is a Polish former wrestler who competed in the 1976 Summer Olympics and in the 1980 Summer Olympics. He lives in Varberg, Sweden.

References

External links
 

1953 births
Living people
Olympic wrestlers of Poland
Wrestlers at the 1976 Summer Olympics
Wrestlers at the 1980 Summer Olympics
Polish male sport wrestlers
Sportspeople from Tarnów
20th-century Polish people
21st-century Polish people